Queyu (Choyo, Choyu) is a poorly attested Qiangic language of Yajiang County and Xinlong County, Sichuan, as well as Tibet. It is similar with and shares a name with Zhaba, but the two languages are distinct from each other.

Dialects
The four dialects of Choyo are those of:
Youlaxi Township 尤拉西乡, Xinlong County (Wang 1991; Huang ed. 1992) (which also has Western Horpa speakers)
Rongba Township 绒坝乡, Litang County (Nishida 2008)
Tuanjie Township 团结乡, Yajiang County (Lu 1985; Sun ed. 1991)
Xiala Township 呷拉乡, Yajiang County (Prins & Nagano 2013) (which also has Dao speakers)

Suzuki & Wangmo (2016) consider the Lhagang Choyu language to be similar to but not part of Choyu proper, which consists of the four dialects listed above.

Huang & Dai (1992) document the Queyu dialect spoken in Youlaxi Township 尤拉西乡, Xinlong County, Ganzi Prefecture, Sichuan.

Lhagang Choyu
Lhagang Choyu is a Qiangic language similar to Choyu recently described by Suzuki & Wangmo (2018). It is spoken in Tage [Thabs-mkhas] Hamlet, southwestern Tagong [lHa-sgang] Town, Kangding [Dar-mdo] Municipality, Sichuan Province, China. It used to be spoken in Xiya 西雅 Hamlet of the same township (Suzuki & Wangmo 2016:63). Lhagang Choyu is an endangered language with about 100 speakers.

References

Nishida, Fuminobu. 2008. Chuyu-go no on'in taikei. Chūgoku kenkyū / Reitaku University 16. 77-85.

Qiangic languages
Languages of China